The Canada men's national wheelchair basketball team is one of Canada's most successful paralympic sporting teams. It is the only national men's wheelchair basketball team to have won two consecutive gold medals at the Paralympic Games in 2000 and 2004, and the only one to have won three paralympic titles. It also won  World Wheelchair Basketball Championships in 2006 and was runner-up in 1986.

History

Paralympic games

IWBF World Championships

Other International Tournaments

Parapan American Games

Men's U25 World Wheelchair Basketball Championships

External links 
 Wheelchair Basketball Canada

Canada at the Paralympics
Wheelchair Basketball, men's
Canada